Butyricimonas is a Gram-negative and anaerobic genus of bacteria from the family of Odoribacteraceae. This bacterium is present in the gastrointestinal tract of various mammals such as rats  and humans.

References

Bacteroidia
Bacteria genera